"Breathe" is a song by American singer-songwriter Maria McKee, released in 1991 as the fourth and final single from her debut studio album, Maria McKee. It was written by McKee and Gregg Sutton, and produced by Mitchell Froom. "Breathe" reached No. 59 in the UK Singles Chart and remained in the Top 100 for two weeks. The song's music video was filmed in Carlow, south-east Ireland, and directed by Angela Conway.

Background
In the UK, McKee originally intended to follow-up her number one hit "Show Me Heaven" with "To Miss Someone", a track from her debut album. The decision was then made to release "Breathe" instead as McKee wanted to "introduce people to the other side of what I do". She told Sounds in 1991, "I have a pretty distinctive sounding voice. I think maybe people responded to the voice on 'Show Me Heaven' and it's the same one on 'Breathe'. It's always good to surprise people too."

Critical reception
Upon its release as a single in the UK, Stuart Bailie of New Musical Express considered "Breathe" to be "a more profound and anxious prospect" than its predecessor "Show Me Heaven" and "a wild description of lovers' empathy and personality transference". He added, "You want intensity? Here's the very one."

In a review of Maria McKee, Steve Terrell of The Santa Fe New Mexican noted the song's melody and "American Indian-style beat" being reminiscent of Patti Smith's "Ain't It Strange". He commented: "McKee's song is worthy of Patti herself. "Breathe" takes a wildly mystical look at love and sex. The song is about the spiritual grafting that takes place between true lovers and how spooky and wonderful that feeling can be." He also praised the guitar work of Richard Thompson, which he described as sounding "like a growling dragon, right on the verge of spewing fire." Steve Pick of the St. Louis Post-Dispatch described the song as "obsessively compelling" and "the album's highlight". He added, ""Breathe" [is] built on the tension among Thompson's patented dark modal guitar fills, Marotta's tom-tom rhythms and McKee's brooding vocals."

Sam Gnerre of The News-Pilot stated: "The eerily spare "Breathe" recalls Patti Smith at her most affecting, with a twisting guitar solo, echoed counter-harmonies and an ethereal violin solo." Holly Crenshaw of The Atlanta Journal-Constitution noted the "all-consuming intimacy" of the song, "heard in its quietly pulsing rhythm and painfully vulnerable lyrics". Greg Kot of the Chicago Tribune wrote: "McKee's voice is more glorious than ever, especially when it wraps itself around a melody as seductive as "Breathe"." Upon its release as a single in the UK in 1991, Steve Stewart of the Aberdeen Press and Journal picked the song as "single of the week" and commented: "Full of tension, with a sensual, soaring vocal delivering emotional lyrics. McKee is to the ballad what The Rolling Stones are to rock."

Track listing
7" and cassette single
"Breathe" - 4:32
"Panic Beach" - 5:49

12" and CD single
"Breathe" - 4:32
"Panic Beach" - 5:49
"Drinkin' In My Sunday Dress" - 3:28

Personnel
 Maria McKee - vocals
 Richard Thompson - guitar
 Steve Wickham - violin
 Jerry Marotta - drums

Production
 Mitchell Froom - producer
 Bruce Brody - associate producer
 Tchad Blake - engineer
 Gary Gersh - executive producer

Other
 Jeffrey Bender - photography

Charts

References

1989 songs
1991 singles
Geffen Records singles
Songs written by Maria McKee
Songs written by Gregg Sutton
Song recordings produced by Mitchell Froom